Digitalis grandiflora, the yellow foxglove, big-flowered foxglove, or large yellow foxglove, is a species of flowering plant in the genus Digitalis, family Plantaginaceae (formerly Scrophulariaceae). It is native to southern Europe and Asia. In mountains it grows on warm, bushy slopes or areas left after logging. The Latin specific epithet grandiflora means “large flowered”.

Description
It is a herbaceous perennial growing from a short rootstock with fibrous roots. In the wild plants bloom in June and July.

Cultivation
Digitalis grandiflora is long lived perennial, it has gained the Royal Horticultural Society's Award of Garden Merit. It is winter hardy is USDA zones 3 to 8 and grows best in moisture retentive, but well drained, organic soils in part shade. Cultivated plants in Germany bloom from June to August, in North America, flowering occurs from May to June in Missouri and from June to July in Ohio; with the typical bloom period lasting eight weeks.

Cultivars
Digitalis grandiflora 'Carillon'
Digitalis grandiflora 'Temple Bells'

Hybrids
 Digitalis × fulva, Lindl. 1821

(Hybrid formula: Digitalis grandiflora Mill. × Digitalis purpurea L.).

Pharmacology
As the plant contains cardenolides, all parts are toxic. Its leaves contain 0.2% glycosides of the digitoxin-type and about 0,1% of the digoxin-type. Even so, the plant is not used in the production of cardiac glycosides.

Gallery

References

grandiflora
Taxa named by Philip Miller